Evan Stewart (born September 4, 2003) is an American football wide receiver for the Texas A&M Aggies.

Early life and high school
Stewart grew up in Frisco, Texas and attended Liberty High School. He had 46 receptions for 913 yards and nine touchdowns inn his junior season. Stewart was rated a four-star recruit and initially committed to play college football at Texas during his junior year over offers from Alabama, Auburn, Florida, Florida State, Georgia, LSU, Michigan, Oklahoma, Oregon, and Texas A&M. He decommitted from the school one month later and re-opened his recruitment. Stewart opted out of his senior season after playing in three games and caught 19 passes 414 yards and three touchdowns. During his senior season, Stewart was re-rated as a five-star prospect and committed to Texas A&M during November of his senior year before signing a National Letter of Intent with the team in December. He played in the 2022 Under Armour All-America Game. Stewart also was a member of the track and field team and won the Texas 5A long jump championship and placed second in the triple jump as a junior.

College career
Stewart joined the Texas A&M Aggies as an early enrollee in January 2022 and participated in spring practices.

References

External links
Texas A&M Aggies bio

Living people
Players of American football from Texas
American football wide receivers
Texas A&M Aggies football players
2003 births